The Little Peshtigo River is an  river in the U.S. state of Wisconsin. It is a tributary of the Peshtigo River.

The Little Peshtigo River begins at Montana Lake and flows through Coleman, Wisconsin, before converging with the Peshtigo River.

See also
List of rivers of Wisconsin

References

Rivers of Wisconsin
Rivers of Marinette County, Wisconsin